Eleanor Thomson McLaughlin (born 3 March 1938) is a Scottish politician, and a former member of the Labour party.

Community charge
McLaughlin refused to pay her Community Charge, and was threatened with a warrant sale on her home.

Lord Provost
Lord Provost of Edinburgh, Scotland, between 1988 and 1992. She was only the third member of the Labour Party ever to hold the office.  She was also the first female Lord Provost and the first Roman Catholic to hold the post since the Reformation.

Devolution and independence
McLaughlin was against devolution, feeling that without "proper tax raising powers"  government could not work.  She changed her mind, and said in 2014 that devolution  had worked, and that the next step was independence.

See also
List of Lord Provosts of Edinburgh

References

External links
 30 years since Labour took Edinburgh, The Scotsman

1938 births
Living people
Lord Provosts of Edinburgh
Scottish Labour councillors
Women councillors in Scotland
Women provosts in Scotland